The 2020 Tyrone Senior Football Championship is the 115th edition of Tyrone GAA's premier gaelic football tournament for clubs in Tyrone Senior Football League Division 1. 16 teams compete with the winners receiving the O'Neill Cup and representing Tyrone in the Ulster Senior Club Football Championship.

Trillick St. Macartan's were the defending champions after they defeated Errigal Ciarán in the 2019 final. However the defence of their title came undone at the ??? stage when losing to ???.

Galbally Pearses, Pomeroy Plunkett's and Loughmacrory St. Teresa's returned to senior championship football in 2020.

??? made the straight drop back down to the Intermediate ranks when finishing bottom of the 2020 S.F.L. They were followed by ??? who lost their S.F.L. Relegation Playoff to ???, who in turn were then relegated after losing their SFL/IFL promotion/relegation playoff to ???. I.F.C. and I.F.L. champions ??? and I.F.L. runners-up ??? will also replace these relegated teams in 2021.

On 4 October 2020, ??? claimed their 8th S.F.C. crown and their first triumph since ??? when defeating ??? by ??? in the final at Healy Park.

The draw for the 2020 S.F.C. was made on 21 February 2020.

Format
The championship has a straight knock out structure. The 16 teams that  take part in the championship are the 16 teams in the Senior Football League (SFL). The emergence of the COVID-19 pandemic has effected relegation and promotion from the S.F.C. and I.F.C. in the following ways:

Relegation from SFC:

In 2020, it was decided that no club would be relegated from the S.F.C.

Promotion to SFC:

Two teams will be promoted to the S.F.C. for 2021, meaning that 18 teams will compete for the Tyrone S.F.C. in 2021. The I.F.C. champions and the I.F.L. champions will gain promotion to the top-flight.

Team Changes
The following teams have changed division since the 2019 championship season.

To S.F.C.
Promoted from 2019 Tyrone I.F.C.
 Galbally Pearses - (IFC & IFL Champions)
 Pomeroy Plunkett's - (IFL Runners-up)
 Loughmacrory St. Teresa's - (SFL/IFL promotion/relegation playoff Winner)

From S.F.C.
Relegated to 2020 I.F.C. 
 Eglish St. Patrick's - (SFL/IFL promotion/relegation playoff Loser)
 Edendork St. Malachy's - (SFL Relegation Loser) 
 Tattyreagh St. Patrick's - (16th in SFL)

Round 1
All 16 teams enter Round 1 in a random open draw. The 8 losers are eliminated from the championship while the 8 winners proceed to the quarter-finals.

Quarter-finals

Semi-finals

Final

Ulster Senior Club Football Championship

References

Tyrone Senior Football Championship
Tyrone Senior Football Championship